

Overview 
documenta 15 is the 15th edition of documenta, a contemporary art exhibition held in Kassel, Germany between June and September 2022. Documenta is a major contemporary art exhibition held every five years in Kassel, Germany. While a postponement to 2023 due to the COVID-19 pandemic was considered likely in early 2021, it is currently still scheduled to run 8 June to 25 September 2022.

documenta 15 was conceptualised and curated by the Indonesian collective ruangrupa. This marked not only the first collective artistic direction of the event, but also the first time a Southeast Asian group held this role. Collaboration and exchange served as key guiding principles for the planning, organisation, and presentation of documenta 15. Unlike previous iterations, this year’s community of participating artists was formed through an initial invitation sent by ruangrupa to 14 core collectives who then invited more participants, leading to a laterally expanding web of almost 1,500 artists and groups. ruangrupa also took the concept of lumbung as a foundational principle, which was then woven through the entire experience of documenta for the organising teams, participating artists, and the audience.

Lumbung

Overview 
The term ‘lumbung’ literally translates to “barn” or “granary” in Bahasa Indonesia, and refers to a community’s practice of storing excess crops for future use as a shared common resource. The term ‘lumbung’ literally translates to “barn” or “granary” in Bahasa Indonesia, and refers to a community’s practice of storing excess crops for future use as a shared common resource. documenta 15 incorporated this model of a “communal resource pot” in all its processes, from budget distrubution to exchanges of ideas and resources among artists, and between artists and audiences.

Kassel venue vandalism 
On 27 May 2022, the Kassel venue in Kassel, Germany, was vandalized. The Kassel venue was a Documenta exhibition space that was set to host "The Question of Funding", created by a Palestinian art collective. Phrases scribbled on the wall included "187" and "PERALTA". The "187" was allegedly a reference to the Penal Code of California for the crime of murder, and "PERALTA" was allegedly a reference to Isabel Medina Peralta, the leader of a Spanish far-right youth group.

Documenta filed a criminal complaint with the city of Kassel following the vandalism, and artists and organizers involved with Documenta15 issued a statement of support for Ruangrupa, the Indonesian collective curating the show. The statement claimed that the collective was erroneously accused of antisemitism.

Antisemitism controversy 
A large painting by the Indonesian artist collective Taring Padi titled "People's Justice" was exhibited at the Documenta fifteen. It features classic anti-Jewish symbols with Nazi imagery from the years 1930s–1940s.

The picture triggered a major political, artistic, and social debate in Germany and Israel, both because the art exhibition has been curated by the Indonesian collective Ruangrupa with ties to the BDS movement and because Documenta was showing artworks that contain explicitly anti-Semitic symbols and stereotypical depictions of Jews in Germany, in 2022. Many observers saw it as a scandal preceded by months of warnings about the anti-Semitic attitudes of the organizing Indonesian collective Ruangrupa, which were ignored by the management of the Documenta, its general director , and others. The Central Council of Jews in Germany had warned Documenta in forehand.

Jörg Sperling, chairman of the Documenta-Forum, criticized the taking-down of the picture featuring Nazi symbols and anti-Semitic depictions of Jews. He stated that the Taring Padi's picture is covered by the freedom of art and that it portrayed the conflict between Israelis and Palestinians. He further described it as a "subject that lies outside of art" and that art cannot solve, "documenta cannot solve that either", he said. He later stepped back from his position as chairman of the Documenta-Forum. Sabine Schormann initially refused to resign and said she "immediately assumed her operational responsibility". The "unforgivable mistake" arose "from an unfortunate set of circumstances", Schormann said. Claudia Roth, who currently serves as the Federal Government Commissioner for Culture and the Media, declared in an official statement that its removal was "overdue" and "is only a first step". She further commented by announcing that "more must follow", and stated: "It must be cleared up how it was possible for this mural with antisemitic figurative elements to be installed there".

This "scandal with announcement" triggered a debate as to whether the Documenta itself should have a future. German President Frank-Walter Steinmeier (SPD) said at the show's official opening, "there are limits” to what artists can do when they address political issues. He declared: “As justified as some criticism of Israeli policies, such as the building of settlements, is, recognizing Israeli statehood means recognizing the dignity and security of the modern Jewish community.” Steinmeier pointed out that the Documenta management should not "outsource their responsibility to the Indonesian curators", but instead should take on the role of mediators and “create appropriate structures" for debate. Federal Chancellor Olaf Scholz (SPD) demonstratively announced that he would stay away from the Documenta this year.

On 17 July, Schormann resigned.

Art professor Bazon Brock commented about the failure of the Documenta management during a radio interview hosted by the German public broadcaster Deutschlandfunk: "People liquidated art in the name of artistic freedom."

References

Further reading

External links
 

2022 in art
2022 in Germany
Antisemitic attacks and incidents in Europe
Antisemitism in Germany
Boycott, Divestment and Sanctions
Documenta
Germany–Indonesia relations
Germany–Israel relations